The 1969 Campeonato Paulista da Divisão Especial de Futebol Profissional, organized by the Federação Paulista de Futebol, was the 68th season of São Paulo's top professional football league. Santos won the title for the 12th time. no teams were relegated and the top scorer was Santos's Pelé with 26 goals.

Championship
The championship was divided into two stages:
First stage: The fourteen teams were divided into two groups of seven teams, and each played in a double round-robin format against the teams of its own group and the other group. the two best teams in each group qualified to the Final round.
Final round: The remaining four teams played in a single round-robin format against each other and the team with the most points won the title.

First stage

Group A

Group B

Final round

Top Scores

References

Campeonato Paulista seasons
Paulista